Un Nuevo Amor may refer to:

 Un Nuevo Amor (Lucero album), 2002
 Un Nuevo Amor (Daniela Romo album), 1994
 "Un Nuevo Amor", a Spanish version of the song "Hopelessly Devoted to You"